South Africa competed at the 2013 Summer Universiade in Kazan, Russia from 6 July to 17 July 2013. 121 athletes were part of the South African team.

In the games, South Africa won 13 medals (22nd place), including 7 gold medals (8th place).

References

Nations at the 2013 Summer Universiade
2013